The Doctor's Wife may refer to:

Books
The Doctor's Wife (Ariyoshi novel), a 1966 novel by Sawako Ariyoshi
The Doctor's Wife (Moore novel), a 1976 novel by Brian Moore

Film and TV
The Doctor's Wife (Doctor Who), a 2011 episode of the British TV series Doctor Who
Doctor's Wife, 1964 TV Episode Gunsmoke (TV series)
The Doctor's Wife (1930 film) comedy short with Franklin Pangborn, Gertrude Astor, Geneva Mitchell and Billy Gilbert
The Doctor's Wife,  2004 TV episode American Justice
The Doctor's Wife,  1952 TV episode Studio One in Hollywood
The Doctor's Wife, 1951 TV episode Lux Video Theatre

See also
"The Doctor and the Doctor's Wife", a short story by Ernest Hemingway